Mrs. Dane's Confession is a 1921 Austrian drama film directed by Michael Curtiz and starring Lucy Doraine and Alfons Fryland.

Plot
As described in a film magazine review, Dorothy Robey, engaged to William Farleigh, jilts him in favor of a Count, who marries her, spends her fortune, and murders her father, without being called to account for the crime. She obtains a divorce and weds Farleigh and a baby is born. The Count reappears, attempts to blackmail her, and threatens to take away her child. In desperation she kills him. Arrested, she tells her story in full and is acquitted by the jury. The action develops in Paris.

Cast
 Lucy Doraine as Dorothy Robey
 Alfons Fryland as William Farleigh
 Otto Treßler as John Robey
 Harry De Loon as Harry Dane
 Kurt von Lessen as Jimmy Fox
 Count Ludi Salm as Harry Harwood

See also
 Michael Curtiz filmography

References

External links

1921 films
1921 drama films
Austrian black-and-white films
Austrian silent feature films
Austrian drama films
Films directed by Michael Curtiz
Silent drama films